Mtyela Kasanda (1840–1884), better known as King Mirambo, was a Nyamwezi king, from 1860 to 1884. He created the largest state by area in 19th-century East Africa in present day Urambo district in Tabora Region of Tanzania. Urambo district is named after him.

Mirambo started out as a trader and the son of a minor chief. He owned trade caravans traveling from the Great Lakes region in western Tanzania to the coast, mostly dealing in ivory and slaves. Through trade with Europeans he acquired firearms and money, and organised armies consisting mostly of teenage orphans. With his newly gained power, he toppled the traditional monarchy of the kingdom of Urambo, and installed himself as ntemi (king). The Nyamwezi aristocracy was appalled when someone who was not royalty took over the religiously ceremonial office of ntemi. Other sources assert that Mirambo was the son of the ruler of Uyowa. His coming to power there was a contravention of the succession being matrilineal.

Mirambo was based in an area with tsetse fly infestations. This meant that transport of goods was almost completely by human porters. Mirambo used both warfare and diplomacy to expand his numbers of followers and the domains he dominated. He began his connections with the caravan business as an agent for his father.

Mirambo built a new capital for his domains at Iselemagazi.

Much of Mirambo's success came from his associations with the Watuta. This was a sub-group of Ngoni people, who were connected with Zwangendaba. With the wars in southern Africa as Shaka had expanded Zulu power, this group had been driven north, this particular sub-group settling near Bukune. Mirambo was closely associated with the Watuta's leader Mpangalala. It seems that it was from Mpangalala Mirambo learned about the age-grade military systems of southern Africa, and this led to Mirambo implementing it in his own similar system called the rugaruga. By the early 1880s this military organization had about 10,000 members.

The 1860s saw Mirambo extend his domains westward and conquer several of the Nyamwezi chiefdoms located to the west of his original domains with his growing rugaruga force. At times chiefdoms voluntarily joined his growing domain, being allowed to stay in power as long as they paid tribute and contributed forces to Mirambo's growing power.

Apart from the Nyamwezi aristocracy, Mirambo also was an enemy of the trading community of Tabora in the kingdom of Unyanyembe. Many of the inhabitants of Tabora were Arab traders, and rivals of Mirambo for the control of the trade across Unyamwezi. These Arabs had powerful allies in Zanzibar on the coast. For most of his time as mtemi, Mirambo fought wars against his enemies. By the time of his death, he had united most of northern Unyamwezi in an alliance under his leadership, but he never managed to conquer Tabora.

Mirambo in the 1870s came to be closely allied with Philippe Broyon, a Swiss merchant operating in the region. He also welcomed missionaries such as John Morton of the Church Missionary Society and Ebenezer Southon of the London Missionary Society to his domains. These missionaries viewed Mirambo as building a stable state in interior east Africa and convinced John Kirk, the British consul at Zanzibar to shift his support in the interior wars to Mirambo over the Kingdom of Unyanyembe.

Near the end of his life he grew ill, and died, age 44. It is possible that he was strangled to death, since an old Nyamwezi custom was to strangle their mtemi when they became unfit to rule.

He was notable for opposing the Arab allies of Henry Morton Stanley.  Stanley dubbed Mirambo "the African Bonaparte" for his military talents.

References

External links
Burnett, Lucy, Mirambo (ca.1840—1884) at blackpast.org

1884 deaths
Tanzanian chiefs
1840 births
People from Tabora Region